Christoph Helmut Keitel (born 30 July 1965 in Lübeck, Germany) is a German physicist, presently a director at the Max Planck Institute for Nuclear Physics (Max-Planck-Institut für Kernphysik) in Heidelberg and an honorary professor ("Honorarprofessor") at Heidelberg University.

Keitel studied physics and mathematics at Leibniz University Hannover and physics at the University of Munich, where he graduated in 1990. As a PhD student, he worked with G. Süssmann, mainly supervised by Marlan O. Scully and L. M. Narducci.

After several years of research in New Mexico, US, and at Imperial College, London, he worked as a Marie Curie fellow at the University of Innsbruck, Austria.

In 1998, he became a SFB junior research group leader at the University of Freiburg, Germany.

In 2000, he obtained the degree of a lecturer and the venia legendi at the University of Freiburg with his post-doctoral thesis on Atomic Systems in Intense Laser Fields.

After working as a lecturer at the universities of Freiburg and Düsseldorf, he was appointed Director at the Max Planck Institute for Nuclear Physics in Heidelberg in 2004, whereof he was the Managing Director 2006 to 2008. In 2005, he was appointed honorary professor at Heidelberg University.

His main areas of research are theoretical laser-induced quantum dynamics, quantum electrodynamics, and nuclear and high-energy physics with extremely strong laser fields (see also homepage of the Theory Division of the Max Planck Institute for Nuclear Physics).

In 2003, he was awarded the Gustav Hertz Prize by the German Physical Society (Deutsche Physikalische Gesellschaft).

References

External links
 Homepage at the Max Planck Institute for Nuclear Physics
 Theory Division of the Max Planck Institute for Nuclear Physics
 

1965 births
Living people
21st-century German physicists
Quantum physicists
Academic staff of Heidelberg University
Theoretical physicists
University of Hanover alumni
Ludwig Maximilian University of Munich alumni
Academic staff of the University of Freiburg
Max Planck Institute directors
People from Lübeck